The Cathedral of the Holy Saviour, also called Adigrat Cathedral, is a Catholic church located in Adigrat, Ethiopia. It is the main place of worship of the Ethiopian Catholic Church. The cathedral is the mother church of the Eparchy of Adigrat (Eparchia Adigratensis). It belonged to the archeparchy of Addis Ababa (Archieparchia Neanthopolitana), which was elevated to its current status in 1961 by Pope John XXIII through the bull "Quod Venerabiles".

The cathedral was built on a site called Welwalo, which was reserved after World War II for the construction of a church, it was the first parish and, after the establishment of the Eparchy and with some additions, became the cathedral being dedicated to the Holy Savior on 19 April 1969, was realized on the basis of an Italian project including the great mural Giudizio Universale (1970) of the Ethiopian artist Afewerk Tekle.

See also

Ethiopian Catholic Church
Catholic Church in Ethiopia
St. Joseph Cathedral, Gambela
Holy Trinity Cathedral, Sodo

References

External links
 Cathedral of the Holy Saviour, Adigrat, Ethiopia (Ethiopic)

Eastern Catholic cathedrals in Ethiopia
Adigrat
Roman Catholic churches completed in 1969
20th-century Roman Catholic church buildings
20th-century churches in Ethiopia